The discography of the J-pop duo Two-Mix consists of seven studio albums, eight compilation albums, and 21 singles released since 1995. In addition, the duo released two studio albums and two singles as II MIX⊿DELTA.

Albums

Studio albums

Extended plays

Self-cover albums

Compilations

Box sets

Remix albums

Tribute albums

Singles

Two-Mix singles

Videography

Music video albums

II MIX⊿DELTA

Albums

Singles

Footnotes

References 

Discographies of Japanese artists
Pop music group discographies